Novisi Aku Abaidoo (born 17 June 1959) is a Ghanaian diplomat who served as Ghana's Ambassador to Belgium from 2 February 2016 to February 2019 when she was replaced by Harriet Sena Siaw-Boateng.

Career 
Prior to her appointment as Ghana's ambassador to Belgium, she was Ghana's Ambassador to Benin and Namibia.

References 

Living people
Ghanaian diplomats
Ghanaian women ambassadors
Ambassadors of Ghana to Benin
Ambassadors of Ghana to Belgium
1959 births